Rebecca Solomon (London 26 September 1832 – 20 November 1886 London) was a 19th-century English Pre-Raphaelite draftsman, illustrator, engraver, and painter of social injustices. She is the second of three children who all became artists, in a prominent Jewish family.

Biography

Rebecca Solomon was born on 26 September 1832, the youngest of the three daughters, and she was one of eight children born into an artistically-inclined Jewish merchant family in Bishopsgate in east London. Her father was Michael (Meyer) Solomon, the first Jew to be honoured with the Freedom of the City of London; her mother was Catherine (Kate) Levy. Solomon was the lesser-known artist to her painter brothers Simeon Solomon (1840–1905) and Abraham Solomon (1824–1862). There were five other children in the family: Aaron, Betsy, Isaac, Ellen, and Sylvester.

Initially Solomon was taught by her older brother Abraham and worked in his studio as an apprentice and copyist. She also, took lessons at the Spitalfields School of Design. Solomon exhibited at the Royal Academy of Arts between 1852 and 1868, and also at the Dudley Gallery and  Gambart's French Gallery.

Solomon worked in the studio of John Everett Millais, one of founders of the Pre-Raphaelite Brotherhood. She also worked with the second wave Pre-Raphaelite artist, Edward Burne-Jones. Solomon taught her younger brother, Simeon, much of what she learned from her assistant-ship to Millais.  Solomon was also active in contemporary social reform movements and in 1859 she joined a group of thirty-eight women artists petitioning the Royal Academy of Arts to open its schools to women, which led to the first woman, Laura Herford, being admitted to the Academy in 1860.

After her elder brother, Abraham's death in 1862, she made sure to find work outside of his studio. As a result, Solomon broadened her material use when developing new works of art. Her newer mediums included: illustration and watercolors.

Her last recorded exhibition was in 1874.

In 1886, Solomon died aged 54, from injuries sustained after being run over by a hansom cab on the Euston Road in central London.

Themes within her work

Solomon's artistic style was typical of popular 19th-century painting at the time and falls under the category of genre painting. She used her visual images to critique ethnic, gender and class prejudice in Victorian England. When Solomon started painting genre scenes, her work demonstrated an observant eye for class, ethnic and gender discrimination. Solomon’s paintings reflect a combination of interest in the theatre and commitment to social consciousness that is not exist in other artist’s painting in the nineteenth century.

One critic commented on the wholesome, moral and sometimes humanizing sentiment in her art, not an uncommon element in Victorian painting. However, Solomon's Jewish background was probably instrumental in developing her critical consciousness of difference and prejudice. Over the next ten to fifteen years, her artwork explored the plight of women and minorities, and the dominance of class discrimination in English society. She is considered among the first women from a Jewish background to make a prominent career as a painter in Britain.

In the late 1850s Solomon made a successful transition to classical and historical painting, the most highly valued genre of art within the powerful art academies of the time. True to her vision, she continued to include images that reflected the historical foundations of nineteenth-century social injustice.

The Governess (1854), compares the lives of two women within a Victorian home; One being an isolated working-class woman and the other, married and of a higher status. This work by Solomon emphasizes the loneliness of a governess’ predicament.

Gallery

Solomon's artworks were exhibited in numerous venues in England from 1850 through 1885. Venues featuring her work included the Royal Academy of Arts, the British Institution, the Royal Society of British Artists, the Royal Institution, Gambart's French Gallery, the Dudley Gallery, and the Liverpool Society of Fine Arts. Her painting Peg Woffington's Visit to Triplet also appeared in the 1867 Exposition Universelle in Paris.

At the Royal Academy's annual Summer Exhibition, Solomon exhibited almost annually between 1852 and 1869.

Her paintings at the Royal Academy were
 A. Solomon, Esq. (1852, no. 1055)
 The Governess (1854, no. 425)
 The Story of Balaclava (1855, no. 1360)
 A Friend in Need (1856, no. 511)
 Tis better to be lowly born, etc. (1857, no. 27)
 Behind the Curtain (1858, no. 1094)
 Love's Labour Lost (1859, no. 548)
 Peg Woffington's Visit to Triplet (1860, no. 269)
 The Arrest of a Deserter (1861, no. 581; now at the Israel Museum, Jerusalem)
 Fugitive Royalists (1862, no. 432; also exhibited at the Dudley Gallery, London in 1866–67)
 Good Night (1863, no. 668)
 Henry Esmond's Welcome at Walcote (1864, no. 502; also titled Beatrix Welcoming Henry Esmond to Walcote)
 The Lion and the Mouse (1865, nos. 459 and 479)
 Heloise (1867, no. 150)
 Giovannina--Roma (1867, no. 484)
 Helena and Hermia (1869, no. 785)
 A Bit of Old London was exhibited posthumously, in 1903 (no. 827)

See also
English women painters from the 19th century who exhibited at the Royal Academy of Arts

 Sophie Gengembre Anderson
 Mary Baker
 Ann Charlotte Bartholomew
 Maria Bell
 Barbara Bodichon
 Joanna Mary Boyce
 Margaret Sarah Carpenter
 Fanny Corbaux
 Rosa Corder
 Mary Ellen Edwards
 Harriet Gouldsmith
 Mary Harrison (artist)
 Jane Benham Hay
 Anna Mary Howitt
 Mary Moser
 Martha Darley Mutrie
 Ann Mary Newton
 Emily Mary Osborn
 Kate Perugini
 Louise Rayner
 Ellen Sharples
 Rolinda Sharples

References

Bibliography
 Marsh, Jan and Pamela Gerrish Nunn. Pre-Raphaelite Women Artists. New York: Thames & Hudson, 1999.
 Ferrari, Roberto C. “Rebecca Solomon, Pre-Raphaelite Sister.” The Review of the Pre-Raphaelite Society, 12:2 (Summer 2004): 23–36.
 Daniels, Jeffery. "Solomon : a family of painters : Abraham Solomon, 1823–1862, Rebecca Solomon, 1832–1886, Simeon Solomon, 1840–1905" London: Inner Education Authority, 1985. 
Nunn, Pamela Gerrish. "Rebecca Solomon's 'A Young Teacher'" The Burlington Magazine Vol. 130, No. 1027 (Oct. 1988), pp. 769–770
Harris, Elree I., and Shirley R. Scott. A Gallery of Her Own: An Annotated Bibliography of Women in Victorian Painting. London: Routledge, 1997.
Hill, Kate. Women and Museums 1850–1914: Modernity and the Gendering of Knowledge. 1st ed., Manchester University Press, 2016
Casteras, Susan P. The Art Bulletin: Reviewed Works, vol. 80, no. 4, 1998, pp. 750–752. JSTOR, www.jstor.org/stable/3051324. Accessed 25 Mar. 2020.
“Rebecca Solomon Biography.” Simeon Solomon Research Archive, www.simeonsolomon.com/rebecca-solomon-biography.html.
Round, Alex. "Rebecca Solomon as a Social Activist", The Victorian Web, https://victorianweb.org/painting/solomonr/round.html

External links

 
Rebecca Solomon on the Simeon Solomon Research Archive: includes biography, secondary sources, exhibition history and artwork database
Rebecca Solomon's work included on the Pre-Raphaelite art sisters page at Pittsburg State University, Kansas – four images shown

1832 births
1886 deaths
19th-century British painters
19th-century English women artists
English Jews
English women painters
Jewish artists
Painters from London
Pedestrian road incident deaths
People from the City of London
Road incident deaths in London
Sibling artists